Hassan Rateb (Arabic: حسن راتب) (born in Egypt) is an Egyptian businessman.

Positions
 Sinai University, Chairman.
 Sama Group, Chairman.
 Sinai Cement Company, Chairman.
 Al Mehwar Satellite Channels, Chairman.
 Egyptian Company for Tourism and Entertainment Projects, Chairman.
 Sinai Foundation for Development, Chairman.
 Sama Social Development, Chairman.
 El Takafol Association, Vice President.
 Red Crescent Association in Giza, General Secretary.
 Suez Canal University, Board Member.
 High Committee for Social Development, Committee Member.
 The Egyptian Strategic Project for Regional Development of Sinai, General Coordinator.
 Egyptian Union of Industries - Cement Branch, President.

Arrest
He was arrested on 28 June 2021 over accusations of funding illegal exacavations for antiquities in Egypt. In April 2022, he was sentenced to 5 years in prison.

See also 
Mehwar TV Channel

References

External links 
 Hassan Rateb's  profile on Sinai University

Egyptian businesspeople
Living people
Year of birth missing (living people)